The Mascom Top 8 Cup is a football cup competition in Botswana. It was created in 2012, and features the top eight finishers from the Botswana Premier League.

Since 2013, the winners qualify for the CAF Confederation Cup, as the FA Challenge Cup is not played. This was stopped in 2019 with the return of the FA Cup.

Format
The Mascom Top 8 Cup is played by the top eight finishers from the previous season of the Premier League. The quarter-finals and semi-finals are played as two-legged ties both home and away, with a once-off final. In the case where the scores are tied after the two-legged ties, the Away goals rule will apply to decide the winner. However, this rule only applies in the first 90 minutes. If the aggregate score and the away goals scored are level after the 90 minutes of the 2nd leg, the teams will proceed to extra time and the Away goals rule will be disregarded thereafter. This means that if the aggregate score is still tied after extra time, the match will proceed to a penalty shoot-out regardless of the away goals scored in that 30 minutes.

This slight deviation from the standard Away goals rule led to controversy in the semi-final of the 2018–19 Mascom Top 8 Gaborone Derby clash between bitter rivals Township Rollers and Gaborone United. Rollers had won the 1st leg 2-0 away. In the 2nd leg, United also won 2-0 away, meaning the match would then proceed to extra time with the 2-2 aggregate score and Away goals rule would not apply then. In extra time, Rollers pulled one back before a late United penalty restored their 2 goal advantage to finish the match at 3-1 (aggregate 3-3). At the end of extra time, Rollers fans and players prematurely celebrated as they thought they were through to the final on away goals. After a delay and reference to the rules of the competition, the penalty shoot-out was eventually played to a mostly empty National Stadium as most of the fans had left, oblivious to what was transpiring on the field of play.

Gaborone United won the shoot-out 10-9 and proceeded to the final where they'd suffer a 0-2 defeat to Jwaneng Galaxy.

Past finals
2011/12: Township Rollers 3-1 ECCO City Greens
2012/13: Gaborone United 2-1 Botswana Defence Force
2013/14: Botswana Defence Force XI 1-1 (aet; 5-4 pen.) Township Rollers
2014/15: Gaborone United 2-1 Township Rollers
2015/16: Orapa United 3-1 (aet) Township Rollers
2016/17: Jwaneng Galaxy 4-3 (aet) Orapa United
2017/18: Township Rollers 4-2 Orapa United
2018/19: Gaborone United 0-2 Jwaneng Galaxy
2019/20:Orapa United 1-1 (aet; 4-3 pen.) Township Rollers
2020/21: Cancelled
2021/22: Cancelled

Results by team

Manager records

References

External links
Official webpage of BPL Mascom Top 8 Cup, Botswana Premier League
2014/15 Mascom Top 8, Botswana Premier League

Football competitions in Botswana